Karel Havlíček (born 16 August 1969) is a Czech politician. He served as the Deputy Prime Minister of the Czech Republic, Minister of Industry and Trade and Minister of Transport in Second Cabinet of Andrej Babiš. Havlíček has been a member of Chamber of Deputies (MP) since 2021.

On 8 February 2023, Andrej Babiš announced that Havlíček will become Shadow Prime Minister in the Shadow Cabinet of ANO 2011.

Personal life 
He was born on 16 August 1969 in České Budějovice. He has two children.

References

1969 births
Living people
People from České Budějovice
ANO 2011 Government ministers
Transport ministers of the Czech Republic
Industry and Trade ministers of the Czech Republic
ANO 2011 MPs
Members of the Chamber of Deputies of the Czech Republic (2021–2025)
Prague University of Economics and Business alumni
Czech Technical University in Prague alumni